Kutchisiren is an extinct genus of mammal which existed in what is now India during the Miocene period. It was named by S. Bajpai, D. P. Domning, D. P. Das, J. Velez-Juarbe, and V. P. Mishra in 2010, and the type species is Kutchisiren cylindrica. It was originally named Kotadasiren gracilis (as a nomen nudum) in 1994, by Das and Basu.

References

Miocene sirenians
Fossil taxa described in 2010
Extinct animals of India
Prehistoric placental genera